This is a list of Turkish football transfers for the summer sale in 2011–12 season. Only moves to and from the Süper Lig are listed.

The summer transfer window officially began on 14 June  2011, although a few transfers took place prior to that date. The window closed at midnight on 5 September 2011.  Players without a club could have joined one at any time, either during or in between transfer windows. Clubs below Süper Lig level could also have signed players on loan at any time. If there is need, clubs could have signed a goalkeeper on an emergency loan, if all others were unavailable.

Summer 2011 transfer window

References

Transfers
Turkey
2011